As per the 1981–2010 climatological norm, widely used in most other European countries, the climate in Budapest has shifted to an oceanic subtropical climate. The data from the 1991-2020 climatological norm confirm this shift.

Winter (November until February) is the coldest and cloudiest time of year. Snowfall does occasonially occur however significantly less than in the past, which reflects the switch from a continental to a subtropical climate that Budapest has made. The spring months (March, April and May) see variable conditions, with a rapid increase in the average temperature. Budapest's summer, lasting from June until August, is the warmest time of year. Sudden heavy showers also occur, particularly in June, which can be a pleasant interruption of the prolonging heatwaves. The autumn in Budapest (September until the end of October) is characterized by less rain than in summer and long sunny days.

Seasons

Spring
Spring is characterized by abundant sunshine and scattered showers. The temperature starts to rise markedly in April, highs usually reach the 25 °C mark at the end of the month, though short cold spells with lows in the 0–5 °C zone and ground frost may strike even in mid-May.

Summer
In the summer, prolonged heat waves with highs between 32 and 35 °C interchange with short cooler and wet periods following cold fronts from the West with highs between 18 and 25 °C. Humidity is usually low in the summer, but may rise during more unsettled weather. In the residential suburbs, humidity is generally lower, leading to lower nighttime temperatures. In the asphalt jungle of Pest, however, temperatures above 25 °C at midnight are not uncommon. Thunderstorms, some of them violent with strong wind gusts and torrential rainfall, are not rare.  The highest temperature ever recorded was 40.7 °C on July 20, 2007.

Autumn
Highs can stay above 20 °C until the end of October. Nights get colder and the first frost arrives usually in the second week of October. Short cool spells vary with the Indian summer that can last for several weeks. November brings abundant rain, sometimes snow and a drastic fall in temperature (a 10 °C fall throughout the month).

Winter
Winters are variable and unpredictable. Westerly winds bring mild oceanic air with highs between 5–10 °C, almost no frost and scattered rain or snow showers. Depressions moving in from the Mediterranean can bring snowstorms with 20–40 cm falling in a single day, followed by cold air from Russia. Atlantic depressions and south wind can bring unusually warm weather with highs reaching 15 °C even in January. The Siberian High brings most years a sunny but very cold period lasting for a week or two with lows in the −15–20 °C range. Anticyclones with centres above Western Europe produce cold inversion fog with no change in day and nighttime temperatures, they stay around or a bit under 0 °C. The fog can last for weeks. Mediterranean depressions moving above the inversion fog layer can bring a day or two of freezing rain.

References

Geography of Budapest
Budapest
Budapest